Filip Rada (born 5 September 1984) is a Czech football player, who currently plays for FK Dukla Prague as a goalkeeper. He is the son of former national team coach Petr Rada.

Career

Early career
Rada started his footballing career at Sparta Prague, going out on loan in his younger years. He joined Bohemians 1905 in the Bohemian Football League on a year-long loan in 2005, keeping a clean sheet in his first ever match in the Czech third tier. However Rada played just four league matches before moving on loan to Břevnov of the same league in October 2005, where he remained for the rest of the 2005–06 season. Rada spent the following season on loan at Blšany in the Czech 2. Liga.

Dukla Prague
Rada went on to Dukla Prague in 2007, keeping three clean sheets in the first part of the 2007–08 Czech 2. Liga. Rada played for Dukla in the second division for four years before the club celebrated promotion to the top-flight Gambrinus liga in 2011. Rada was responsible for two of the visiting team's goals in August 2011 as league champions FC Viktoria Plzeň won 4–2 against Dukla in Prague, dropping the ball in the goal area immediately before one goal and kicking a goal kick along the ground directly to an opponent, allowing an easy goal on another occasion. In November 2012, Rada extended his contract with Dukla until the summer of 2015. He signed another extension to his contract, in the winter break of the 2018–2019 season, until 2022.

Honours

Club
 FK Dukla Prague
 Czech 2. Liga: 2010–11

Career statistics

References

External links
 Guardian Football
 
 
 Profile at Bohemians website 

1984 births
Living people
Czech footballers
Association football goalkeepers
Czech First League players
Bohemians 1905 players
FK Chmel Blšany players
FK Dukla Prague players
Footballers from Prague
Czech National Football League players